The 2022 Tata Open Maharashtra was a 2022 ATP Tour tennis tournament happening on outdoor hard courts. It was the 26th edition of the only ATP tournament played in India and took place in Pune, India, from 31 January through 6 February 2022. It was a ATP 250 championship and South Asia's only ATP Tour event.

This edition took place without crowds due to the COVID-19 pandemic.

Champions

Singles 

  João Sousa def.  Emil Ruusuvuori, 7–6(11–9), 4–6, 6–1

This was Sousa's 4th ATP singles title.

Doubles 

  Rohan Bopanna /  Ramkumar Ramanathan def.  Luke Saville /  John-Patrick Smith, 6–7(10–12), 6–3, [10–6]

Point and prize money

Point distribution

Prize money 

*per team

Singles main-draw entrants

Seeds 

 1 Rankings are as of 17 January 2022.

Other entrants 
The following players received wildcards into the singles main draw:
  Prajnesh Gunneswaran
  Arjun Kadhe
  Ramkumar Ramanathan

The following player received entry using a protected ranking into the singles main draw:
  Yuki Bhambri

The following players received entry from the qualifying draw:
  Jay Clarke
  Vít Kopřiva
  Gian Marco Moroni
  Elias Ymer

Withdrawals 
Before the tournament
  James Duckworth → replaced by  Hugo Grenier
  John Millman → replaced by  Quentin Halys

Doubles main-draw entrants

Seeds 

 1 Rankings are as of 17 January 2022.

Other entrants 
The following players received wildcards into the doubles main draw:
  Yuki Bhambri /  Divij Sharan
  Arjun Kadhe /  Purav Raja

Withdrawals 
 Before the tournament
  Radu Albot /  Ričardas Berankis → replaced by  Sriram Balaji /  Vishnu Vardhan
  Matthew Ebden /  Max Purcell → replaced by  Saketh Myneni /  Mukund Sasikumar
  Alexander Erler /  Lucas Miedler → replaced by  Alexander Erler /  Jiří Veselý
  Treat Huey /  Christopher Rungkat → replaced by  Gianluca Mager /  Emil Ruusuvuori
  Evan King /  Alex Lawson → replaced by  Hugo Grenier /  Quentin Halys 
  Ivan Sabanov /  Matej Sabanov → replaced by  James Cerretani /  Nicholas Monroe

Television broadcast
Tata Open Maharashtra 2022 is live and exclusively running on Star sports select 1 channel in India and live streams on Disney Plus Hotstar app.

References

External links 

Official website 

 
Maharashtra Open
Sports competitions in Pune
Tata Open Maharashtra
Maharashtra
Tata Open Maharashtra
Tata Open Maharashtra
Pune
Maharashtra